Lalgola College, established in 2006, is a general degree college in Lalgola, Murshidabad district. It offers undergraduate courses in arts. It is affiliated to  University of Kalyani.

Departments

Arts
Bengali
English
Arabic
Sanskrit
History
Political Science
Education
Philosophy

Accreditation
The college is recognized by the University Grants Commission (UGC).

See also

References

External links
Lalgola College
University of Kalyani
University Grants Commission
National Assessment and Accreditation Council

Universities and colleges in Murshidabad district
Colleges affiliated to University of Kalyani
Educational institutions established in 2006
2006 establishments in West Bengal